Bali Air was a subsidiary of Bouraq Indonesia Airlines based in Soekarno-Hatta International Airport, Cengkareng. The airline ceased scheduled operations in 2005 after its parent company declared bankruptcy.

History
Formerly known as Bali International Air Service, the airline was established in 1973. It was wholly owned by Bouraq Indonesia Group.

Destinations
Balikpapan - Sultan Aji Muhammad Sulaiman Airport
Banjarmasin - Syamsudin Noor Airport
Batam - Hang Nadim Airport
Denpasar - Ngurah Rai International Airport
Jakarta - Soekarno–Hatta International Airport (hub)
Surabaya - Juanda International Airport
Yogyakarta - Adisutjipto International Airport
Jambi - Sultan Thaha Airport
Pangkal Pinang - Depati Amir Airport
Padang - Sutan Sjahrir Air Force Base formerly Tabing Intl. Airport
Ambon - Patimura Airport

Fleet

The Bali Air fleet consisted of the following aircraft (as of August 2005):
 
2 Vickers Viscount 
1 Vickers Vanguard
1 Fokker F28
3 Boeing 737 Specifically BOEING 737-200Advance

References

Defunct airlines of Indonesia
Airlines established in 1973
Airlines disestablished in 2006
Indonesian companies established in 1973
2006 disestablishments in Indonesia